Symphony No. 36 may refer to:

Symphony No. 36 (Haydn), composed by Joseph Haydn in the first half of the 1760s
Symphony No. 36 (Michael Haydn), composed by Michael Haydn in 1788
Symphony No. 36 (Mozart), composed by Wolfgang Amadeus Mozart in late 1783

036